Buis is a Dutch surname that may refer to
Dale R. Buis (1921–1959), U.S. Army Major killed in Vietnam
Dyan Buis (born 1990), South African Paralympic sprinter and long jumper
Greg Buis, American reality show contestant
Jan Buis (born 1933), Dutch cyclist
Leen Buis (1906–1986), Dutch cyclist
Lela E. Buis, American speculative fiction writer, playwright, poet and artist
Marjolein Buis (born 1988), Dutch wheelchair tennis player
Tom Buis, former president of the American National Farmers Union

BUIS may also refer to
Backup iron sights, a type of firearm sights